Luis Carlos Álvarez Valdés (born 3 September 2004) is a Mexican tennis player.

Álvarez Valdés has a career high ATP singles ranking of 1156 achieved on 29 August 2022. He also has a career high ATP doubles ranking of 2171 achieved on 22 August 2022.

Álvarez Valdés represents Mexico at the Davis Cup, where he has a W/L record of 1–0.

References

External links

2004 births
Living people
Mexican male tennis players
21st-century Mexican people